Saz style (Turk. saz yolu) is a style of vegetal ornament and associated with it art style in the 16th-century Ottoman Empire.

Saz was a style of vegetal ornament popular in Ottoman decorative arts of the 16th century, characterized by the use of long, feathery sawtoothed leaves and composite blossoms. At the same time, saz is also used as a name for the art style, in which saz ornament was basic element of the compositions. Contrary to the better known historical style of Ottoman painting saz style served no direct illustrative purpose, therefore might be described as lyrical. Its works are fantastic and virtuosic displays of technique using the saz qalami, or reed pen, that gave this group of works its name. Saz style is represented by two distinct groups of artistic products. The first "consists of album drawings, book illumination, and other works on paper; the second, derived from these paper images, includes virtually all the Ottoman decorative art forms, from bookbinding through textiles, carpets, metalwork, stonecarving, and ceramics"

History 
Saz style in which mythical creatures derived from Chinese or Islamic sources move through an enchanted forest made up of oversized composite blossoms and feathery leaves have parallels in the art of the Aqqoyunlu and Safavid courts at Tabriz". It is no coincidence that two named artists associated with it, Şahkulu and Veli Can, both came to Istanbul from Tabriz, in c. 1520 and 1580 respectively. Şahkulu played a great role in the formation of saz style, and Veli Can took part in its later phase. According to Walter B. Denny, there is a great difference between the early and later phases of the saz style. The clarity, spontaneity and almost reckless qualities of earlier drawings gave way to a concern for finish, texture and far more balanced composition. Apart from saz ornament, drawings in saz style used many other motifs, often derived from China, which formed compositions of complex foliage usually intertwined with birds, beasts, and cloud bands. For them, Turkish scholars use the term hatayi, or "in the Cathayan manner". Chinese mythological creatures include the dragon, phoenix and Qilin, other creatures like the simurgh or peri (in Western sources often called angels) are borrowed from Iranian tradition. One of the specific motifs is also "suicidal leaf", which, twisted, pierce itself. Veli Can seems to be primarily interested in figural subjects, and apart from figures of peri, he is associated with many pictures of young men and women.

Although it started during the reign of Suleiman (1520-1566), from whom Şahkulu received many favours, the saz style reached its apogee under Murad III (1574-1595), for example in an album (muraqqa) compiled for the future sultan in 1572–3 (Österreich. Nbib., Cod. Mixt. 313). Murad III was the most important patron of the style and his death in 1595, accompanied by ongoing deterioration of court workshops in time of price revolution, resulted in its decline. After 1600 the saz style ceased to be an important, but still, it showed an amazing tenacity. Because it had become virtually synonymous with the glorious days of the Ottoman Empire, it was the subject of self-conscious attempts at revival, for example in tiles of Baghdad Kiosk in the 1630s or painted-wood decorations of the kiosk attached to the Valide Mosque in c. 1663. Countless bookbindings and endpapers kept the tradition alive into the nineteenth century, and its widespread diffusion have left imprints as diverse as decorations of Aleppo Room (in Museum of Islamic Art, Berlin) or patterned "bizarre silks" woven in France in the early eighteenth century.

Drawings

Others

References

Bibliography 
 
 
 
 
 

Ottoman art
Art movements
Ornaments
16th century in art